Michael Chukwuwike Odibe (born July 23, 1988) is a Nigerian footballer who plays for Concordia Chiajna in Romanian Liga II.

Career

Siena
On 1 February 2010, Siena signed the defender on loan from the Belgian club Saint-Gilles.

Südtirol(loan)
On 31 January 2011 left AC Siena and joined on loan for six months to Südtirol.

Arsenal Kyiv(loan)
On 31 August 2011, Odibe joined the Ukrainian Premier League outfit Arsenal Kyiv on a season-long loan deal.

Atyrau
In January 2014, Odibe joined Atyrau in the Kazakhstan Premier League following the cancellation of his Arsenal Kyiv contract when they dissolved.

International career
Odibe was called for the Super Eagles for the friendly game against Sierra Leone national football team in his hometown Lagos on 9 February 2011.

Honours

Club
Mağusa Türk Gücü
 KTFF Süper Lig: 2018–19

References

External links
 
 
 Michael Odibe at Footballdatabase

1988 births
Living people
Nigerian footballers
Expatriate footballers in Italy
Nigerian expatriate footballers
Royale Union Saint-Gilloise players
A.C.N. Siena 1904 players
F.C. Südtirol players
FC Arsenal Kyiv players
FC Dnipro players
FC Atyrau players
CS Concordia Chiajna players
FC Akzhayik players
FCV Farul Constanța players
Serie A players
Ukrainian Premier League players
Liga I players
Kazakhstan Premier League players
Liga II players
Nigerian expatriate sportspeople in Belgium
Expatriate footballers in Belgium
Nigerian expatriate sportspeople in Italy
Nigerian expatriate sportspeople in Ukraine
Expatriate footballers in Ukraine
Nigerian expatriate sportspeople in Romania
Expatriate footballers in Romania
Nigerian expatriate sportspeople in Kazakhstan
Expatriate footballers in Kazakhstan
Nigerian expatriate sportspeople in Cyprus
Expatriate footballers in Cyprus
Nigerian expatriate sportspeople in Iraq
Expatriate footballers in Iraq
Al-Mina'a SC players
Association football defenders
Sportspeople from Lagos